William Payne Stewart (January 30, 1957 – October 25, 1999) was an American professional golfer who won eleven PGA Tour events, including three major championships, the last of which came just a few months before his death in an airplane accident at the age of 42.

Stewart gained his first major title at the 1989 PGA Championship. He won the 1991 U.S. Open after a playoff against Scott Simpson. At the 1999 U.S. Open Stewart captured his third major title after holing a  par putt on the final hole for a one-stroke victory.

Stewart was a popular golfer with spectators, who responded enthusiastically to his distinctive clothing. He was reputed to have the biggest wardrobe of all professional golfers and was a favorite of photographers because of his flamboyant attire of ivy caps and patterned pants, which were a cross between plus fours and knickerbockers, a throwback to the once-commonplace golf "uniform." Stewart was also admired for having one of the most gracefully fluid and stylish golf swings of the modern era.

Early years
Stewart was born and raised in Springfield, Missouri, and attended Greenwood Laboratory School, a K-12 school, on the campus of Missouri State University. He played collegiate golf at Southern Methodist University in Dallas, Texas, where he was a member of Phi Gamma Delta and graduated in 1979.  Stewart met Tracey Ferguson, sister of Australian golfer Mike Ferguson, in Kuala Lumpur in 1980 while he was playing on the Asia Golf Circuit, and they were married by November 1982.

Career

Early professional career: 1981–1988
Stewart failed to earn a PGA Tour card at Qualifying School in his graduation year, so he played on the Asia Golf Circuit for a couple of years. He won two tournaments in 1981, including the Indonesia Open in a playoff over three players. Later that year, he earned his PGA Tour card for 1982 and won his first title on the tour at that year's Quad Cities Open. This win was especially memorable to him because it was the only time his father, Bill, saw him win. Stewart's father had played in the 1955 U.S. Open, and had introduced his son to the game.

In 1983, Stewart gained his second PGA Tour victory by winning the Walt Disney World Golf Classic by two strokes. At the 1985 Byron Nelson Golf Classic, Stewart came to the 72nd hole with a three-shot lead. Moments after Bob Eastwood birdied the final hole of regulation, Stewart took a double bogey to end the tournament tied for first. Stewart then made another double bogey on the first playoff hole, causing him to lose to Eastwood. 

In 1985, Stewart came close to winning The Open Championship, when he finished one stroke behind the champion Sandy Lyle.

Stewart briefly led the U.S. Open in 1986 during the back nine of the final round at Shinnecock Hills. After birdieing the 11th and 12th, Stewart took a one-shot lead, but he then had bogeys at the 13th and 14th, finishing the tournament tied for sixth place, behind the winner Raymond Floyd.

Stewart had four runner-up finishes on the PGA Tour in 1986. Despite not winning a tournament that year, he had the most top-10 finishes of any player on the PGA Tour in 1986, finishing inside the top-10 sixteen times.

Stewart won the Hertz Bay Hill Classic in Orlando, Florida in 1987, shooting a third round of 63 and a final round of 65 to beat South African David Frost by three shots. The tournament was a two-man duel in the final round, as Frost finished eight shots ahead of the third-place finisher Dan Pohl. Stewart's victory was a memorable one to him as it came on his home course. His house was situated adjacent to the 12th tee of the Bay Hill Club course in Orlando, Florida. Stewart's cumulative tournament score of 264 is, to date, still a record for the lowest aggregate score over 72 holes in the event, which later became known as the "Arnold Palmer Invitational" held at the same Bay Hill venue.

After his 1987 victory at Bay Hill, Stewart donated his $108,000 prize money to a Florida hospital in memory of his father, who died of cancer in 1985.

Stewart had two runner-up finishes on the PGA Tour in 1988, at The Honda Classic and the Provident Classic.

Major victories: 1989–1999
In April 1989, Stewart won the MCI Heritage Golf Classic by five strokes, with a then tournament-record score of 268, 16-under-par. His victory at the Heritage Classic was his 18th top-10 finish on the PGA Tour since his previous win at the Bay Hill Classic in March 1987. Stewart was gaining a reputation for being one of the most consistent players on the PGA Tour and one of the best players in the world not yet to have won a major championship at that point.

At Kemper Lakes Golf Club, Stewart won the PGA Championship in 1989, his first major title. At the start of the final round, Stewart was six shots behind the leader Mike Reid. He made up five strokes in the final three holes to overtake Reid and win by a stroke. Stewart's back-nine of 31 included birdies on four of his last five holes. He was able to gain the lead over Reid, who bogeyed the 16th, double-bogeyed the 17th, and missed a seven-foot (2 m) birdie putt on the 18th, which would have forced a playoff. After the tournament, Stewart said: "This is a dream I've been trying to realize for a long time." Reid shed tears and said: "As disappointed as I am, I'm happy for Payne."

The following year, Stewart became the first player to win back-to-back titles at the MCI Heritage Golf Classic at Harbour Town Golf Links, winning a playoff against Larry Mize and Steve Jones on the second extra hole with an  birdie putt. This was his first playoff win on the PGA Tour, having lost all five of his playoffs in the 1980s. In May 1990, Stewart won his second tournament of the year at the GTE Byron Nelson Golf Classic. As a result of this victory and runner-up finishes at the Western Open and 1990 Open Championship Stewart reached his Official World Golf Ranking (OWGR) peak of number 3 in the summer of 1990. At the end of 1990, Stewart was ranked as the fifth-best golfer in the world on the OWGR. Overall, Stewart spent nearly 250 weeks within the top 10 of the OWGR between 1986, the year the OWGR began, and 1999, the year of his death.

Stewart's second major title came at the 1991 U.S. Open after an 18-hole Monday playoff with Scott Simpson on a windblown Hazeltine National Golf Club course in Minnesota. Stewart was two shots behind Simpson going into the final three holes of the playoff. After the 16th hole, the match was squared, as Stewart holed a  birdie putt and Simpson missed a  par putt. Stewart's par on the 18th hole won the playoff by two strokes.

The following month, Stewart won the 1991 Heineken Dutch Open by nine shots, which included a course record of 62 in the third round. Stewart won the Hassan II Golf Trophy in Morocco in 1992 and 1993.

In 1993 at Royal St George's Golf Club in England, Stewart's fourth round of 63 tied the record for the lowest individual round in The Open Championship. He was one of 10 players, until Branden Grace shot a 62 in 2017, to hold the record for shooting a 63 at the British Open. In 1995, Stewart gained his first U.S. PGA Tour win in four years by winning the Shell Houston Open in a playoff over Scott Hoch, who lost a six-shot lead with seven holes to play. Hoch collapsed on the back-nine with three bogeys and a double-bogey on the 17th when his tee shot found water. Stewart won the playoff on the first extra hole.

In the 1998 U.S. Open at Olympic Club in San Francisco, Stewart had a four-shot lead going into the final round, but lost to Lee Janzen by a stroke. Stewart missed a 25-foot birdie putt on the 18th hole of his final round, which would have forced a playoff with Janzen.

The following year at the 1999 U.S. Open at Pinehurst Resort, Stewart won his last major title, memorably holing a 15-foot par putt that defeated Phil Mickelson by a stroke in the final round when Tiger Woods and Vijay Singh were also in contention for the trophy. Stewart credited his winning putt to being more at peace with himself after his strengthened religious belief. A statue of Stewart celebrates his winning putt behind the 18th green of the No. 2 course at Pinehurst Resort.

At the time of his death, Stewart was ranked third on the all-time money list and in the top 10 of the Official World Golf Ranking – he had been ranked in the top 10 for almost 250 weeks from 1986 to 1993, and again in 1999. At a time of international domination of the golf scene in the late 1980s and early 1990s, he was often the highest-ranked American player.

Stewart represented the United States on five Ryder Cup teams (1987, 1989, 1991, 1993, and 1999). He also played for the U.S. on three World Cup teams. His Ryder cup record was 8–9–2. Stewart was known for his patriotic passion for the Ryder Cup, once saying of his European opponents, "On paper, they should be caddying for us." The United States team was 3–1–1 during the five times he played. He was disappointed to miss out in 1995 and 1997 when he failed to qualify automatically and was not chosen as a captain's pick. In the 1999 Ryder Cup, Stewart criticized the heckling of European player Colin Montgomerie. With victory assured for the United States, Stewart conceded a putt (and his own singles match) to Montgomerie on the 18th hole. "This game is about sportsmanship," Stewart said afterward.

Stewart was a golfing traditionalist, who once said: "In the United States, all we do is play the ball in the air." He gained an affection for links golf, becoming a popular figure in Ireland after playing on Irish courses to warm up for The Open Championship. After he died in 1999, Waterville Golf Links in County Kerry, Ireland, commissioned a bronze statue of Stewart to pay tribute to him and his affiliation with Waterville. Stewart historically played well in The Open Championship, finishing runner-up in 1985 and 1990. In general, he was known to play well internationally, posting victories at the 1981 Indian Open, the 1981 Indonesia Open, and Japan Golf Tour's 1985 Jun Classic. He also played in international tournaments that were less obscure for American golfers, posting runners-up at the 1982 Australian Open, 1989 German Masters, and the 1993 Scottish Open. He also won the 1991 Dutch Open.

For a large part of his career, Stewart was known for his National Football League (NFL) sponsorship, whereby he wore the team colors of the geographically closest NFL franchise; the sponsorship ended in May 1995.

Stewart appeared on an episode of the American television sitcom Home Improvement titled "Futile Attraction", which aired on March 10, 1998, and featured Stewart as himself. 

Stewart was also a musician, and played harmonica in the blues rock group Jake Trout and the Flounders, which also included fellow golfers Larry Rinker and Peter Jacobsen. The band released one album, I Love to Play in 1998. The music video for the title track, a golf-themed parody of Randy Newman's "I Love L.A.", earned rotation on VH-1.

Death

On October 25, 1999, a month after the American team rallied to win the Ryder Cup and four months after his U.S. Open victory, Stewart was killed in the crash of a Learjet flying from his home in Orlando, Florida, to Texas for the year-ending tournament, The Tour Championship, held at Champions Golf Club in Houston. National Transportation Safety Board (NTSB) investigators concluded that the aircraft failed to pressurize and that all on board were incapacitated by hypoxia as the aircraft passed to the west of Gainesville, Florida. The aircraft continued flying on autopilot until it ran out of fuel and crashed into a field near Mina, South Dakota.

At the time of his death, Stewart had won $12,673,193 in career earnings. He won over $2 million during the 1999 season and finished seventh on the year's money list.

Legacy

At that week's tournament, The Tour Championship, Stewart's good friend, Stuart Appleby, organized a tribute to his friend. With Stewart's wife's permission, he wore one of Payne's own signature outfits for the final round of the tournament on Sunday, and most of the rest of the golfers in the field wore "short pants" that day, as well.

The tournament had been delayed in order to allow those who would be competing in it to attend Stewart's memorial service at the First Baptist Church of Orlando on October 30. Speakers included Tracey Stewart and Paul Azinger, both a fellow professional and one of Stewart's close friends, while attendees included Woods, Mickelson, Jack Nicklaus, Greg Norman, Davis Love III, Hal Sutton, Justin Leonard and Fred Couples, along with MLB pitcher Orel Hershiser, another friend of Stewart's.

One year after Stewart's death, his widow Tracey and their two children, and the family of Stewart's agent, Robert Fraley, who also died on that flight, brought a lawsuit against Learjet, flight operator SunJet Aviation, Inc., and aircraft owner JetShares One Inc.  They alleged that a cracked adapter resulted in an airflow valve detaching from the frame, causing a fatal loss of cabin pressure. They also claimed that the aircraft was severely out of maintenance because of SunJet's negligence. In April 2000 as part of a federal criminal investigation, the Federal Bureau of Investigation raided SunJet and seized its flight logbooks, effectively grounding all of its aircraft.  The investigation was dropped in 2002, but it was too late to save SunJet; unable to legally operate, it had filed for bankruptcy protection in June 2000. The case against Learjet went forward in state court in Orlando. In June 2005, jurors found that the aircraft's manufacturer had no liability in the deaths of Stewart and Fraley and that no negligence was found in the design or manufacture of the aircraft.

The segment of Interstate 44 passing through Springfield, Missouri, was designated the "Payne Stewart Memorial Highway" in his memory. Payne Stewart Drive in Fullerton, California, and Payne Stewart Drive in Surrey, British Columbia, Canada, leading into Northview golf course designed by Arnold Palmer, were named after him.  Finally, Payne Stewart Drive in Jacksonville, Florida, houses The First Tee along with a Job Corps center.

The communities of Mina and Aberdeen created their own memorial. Jon Hoffman, the owner of the property where the aircraft crashed, contacted Stewart's widow and several family members of other crash victims. All agreed that the memorial would be a rock from the crash site, engraved with the victims' names and a Bible passage. Hoffman fenced in about an acre (4,000 m2) of the property surrounding the memorial.

In 2000, the PGA Tour established the Payne Stewart Award, given each year to a player who shows respect for the traditions of the game, commitment to uphold the game's heritage of charitable support and professional and meticulous presentation of himself and the sport through his dress and conduct. At Pinehurst No. 2, a bronze statue of Stewart celebrating his winning putt in the 1999 U.S. Open there overlooks the 18th green. On the first day of the 2014 U.S. Open, the second time that Pinehurst No. 2 had hosted the tournament since 1999, Rickie Fowler wore plus fours and argyle socks in tribute to Stewart.

Also, at the 2000 U.S. Open at Pebble Beach, where Stewart would have been the defending champion, further tributes were paid. Firstly, on the eve of the tournament, there was another memorial at the 18th hole where speakers again included Tracey Stewart and Azinger. This time, the attendees included Stewart's old caddy Mike Hicks plus other professionals due to compete in the tournament such as Mickelson, Love, David Duval, Tom Lehman, Lee Janzen and Sergio García, and it concluded with shots being hit into Stillwater Cove in a golf version of a 21-gun salute. The next day, when Stewart's defending champion spot in the traditional initial pairings alongside the Open Championship winner (Paul Lawrie) and U.S. Amateur winner (David Gossett) was given to Nicklaus playing in his 44th consecutive and final U.S. Open, Nicklaus asked for a moment of silence before his opening tee shot. García also wore Stewart's trademark navy plus fours in his honor during his first round.

In tribute to Stewart, as well as his southwestern Missouri roots, the Payne Stewart Golf Club was opened in Branson, Missouri, in June 2009 with the approval of Stewart's widow. Ground-breaking on the $31 million layout took place on July 24, 2006. The 7,319-yard, 18-hole course was designed by Bobby Clampett and Chuck Smith. Each hole on the course is named for some aspect or notable moment in Stewart's life. The fifth hole, for example, named "Road Hole", recounts the par Stewart made in the first round of the 1990 Open Championship at Old Course at St Andrews when he was forced to knock his third shot against the wall behind the green at the Old Course's treacherous 17th. His ball finished just on the back fringe from where he chipped in. Later in 2020, Woods christened the first public course by him and his company TGR Design at Big Cedar Lodge near Branson as Payne's Valley in Stewart's honor.

On the 10th anniversary of Stewart's death in 2009, Golf Channel presented a special program to remember his life. It included recorded interviews with family, friends, and archived videos of his golf career.

Professional wins (24)

PGA Tour wins (11)

*Note: Tournament shortened to 54 holes due to weather.

PGA Tour playoff record (3–6)

European Tour wins (4)

European Tour playoff record (1–0)

Japan Golf Tour wins (1)

*Note: The 1985 Gene Sarazen Jun Classic was shortened to 54 holes due to rain.

PGA Tour of Australasia wins (1)

Asia Golf Circuit wins (2)

Other wins (8)

Other playoff record (1–2)

Major championships

Wins (3)

1Defeated Simpson in an 18-hole playoff – Stewart 75 (+3), Simpson 77 (+5).

Results timeline

CUT = missed the half-way cut (3rd round cut in 1984 Open Championship)
"T" = tied

Summary

Most consecutive cuts made – 11 (1987 Open Championship – 1990 Masters)
Longest streak of top-10s – 3 (twice)

Results in The Players Championship

CUT = missed the halfway cut
"T" indicates a tie for a place

Results in World Golf Championships

QF, R16, R32, R64 = Round in which player lost in match play
"T" = Tied

U.S. national team appearances
Professional
Four Tours World Championship: 1986, 1987 (winners), 1989 (winners), 1990
Ryder Cup: 1987, 1989 (tied), 1991 (winners), 1993 (winners), 1999 (winners)
World Cup: 1987, 1990
Alfred Dunhill Cup: 1993, 1999
Wendy's 3-Tour Challenge (representing PGA Tour): 1996 (winners)

See also 

 Spring 1981 PGA Tour Qualifying School graduates

References

External links

A biography written when he was inducted into the Hall of Fame

American male golfers
SMU Mustangs men's golfers
PGA Tour golfers
Winners of men's major golf championships
Ryder Cup competitors for the United States
World Golf Hall of Fame inductees
Golfers from Missouri
Sportspeople from Springfield, Missouri
Deaths from hypoxia
Victims of aviation accidents or incidents in 1999
Victims of aviation accidents or incidents in the United States
1957 births
1999 deaths